Statistics of Brunei Premier League for the 2005–06 season.

Overview
It was contested by 10 teams, and QAF FC won the championship.

League standings

References
Brunei 2005/06 (RSSSF)

Brunei Premier League seasons
Brunei
1
1